Shane Walsh (born 10 January 1996) is an Irish hurler. At club level he plays with Tullaroan and at inter-county level with the Kilkenny senior hurling team.

Honours

Tullaroan
All-Ireland Intermediate Club Hurling Championship: 2020 (c)
Leinster Intermediate Club Hurling Championship: 2019 (c)
Kilkenny Intermediate Hurling Championship: 2019 (c)

Kilkenny
Leinster Senior Hurling Championship: 2022
Leinster Under-21 Hurling Championship: 2017

References

1996 births
Living people
Tullaroan hurlers
Kilkenny inter-county hurlers